Nowe Sady can refer to three villages in Poland:

Nowe Sady, Opole Voivodeship
Nowe Sady, Subcarpathian Voivodeship
Nowe Sady, Warmian-Masurian Voivodeship